Ma is the Chinese word for cannabis. The term ma, used to describe medical marijuana by 2700 BCE, is the oldest recorded name for the hemp plant.

History and migration of the word ma
The word má has been used to describe the hemp plant since before the invention of writing five-thousand years ago. Ma is likely to be derived from the masculine energy associated with cannabis in traditional Chinese medicine. Evidence of one of the earliest human cultivation of hemp/cannabis was found off the coast of mainland China, on the island of Taiwan. Chinese trading travelers who moved west towards India and Africa acquired seeds of the ma plant and also brought the plant's name with them.

Ma in poetry and song
Ancient Chinese prose and poems, including poetry in the Shi jing (Book of Odes), mention the word ma many times. An early song refers to young women weaving ma into clothing.

Use of the word ma in other languages
The term ma is commonly used to describe hemp in Asia. The word  is used for cannabis in Japan. In the West, the word was used by scholars and journalists when discussing cannabis regulations and law publicly (due to prohibition).

Root of Mexican Spanish word marijuana
The term marihuana or marijuana is thought to have originated, at the end of the 19th century, with Mexican immigrants to the United States who began using the word after hearing Chinese-American immigrants calling marijuana ma ren hua, an expression which translated literally means “hemp-seed-flower”. An exact origin of the word marijuana is uncertain. Possible explanations include other terms that can be traced to the Chinese word ma.

Variations
The word ma is often paired with the Chinese word for "big" or "great" to form the compound word dàmá (大麻) which is sometimes used to describe  hemp, as there is less associated with the word ma by itself, as it lacks descriptiveness  

Historical Chinese medical texts (c. 200 CE) through contemporary twentieth century Chinese medical literature discuss individual terms for ma, including máfén (麻蕡), máhuā (麻花), and mábó (麻勃), referring to specific parts of the male and female flowers of a cannabis plant.

References

Sources

Cannabis
Cannabis culture
Chinese words and phrases
Etymologies